Ivan Ivanovich Saenko (born 17 October 1983) is a Russian former footballer who played as a winger.

Club career
Saenko was born in Maslovka. In August 2008, Saenko moved to Spartak Moscow due to his unwillingness to play in the second division after 1. FC Nürnberg's relegation. He missed the second half of the 2009 season due to injuries. Saenko had never found himself a new team and retired in 2011.

International career
After finished second in qualifying group stage with Russia U-21 at the 2006 UEFA European Under-21 Football Championship, Saenko received first senior call up against Croatia on 6 September 2006 and as unused bench. He made his debut one month later against Estonia on 11 October 2006 as last minutes substitution.

He was called up to Russia's UEFA Euro 2008 squad and was a second-half substitute in both their second match against Greece in Salzburg and third match against Sweden in Innsbruck, but started the quarter-final against the Netherlands in Basel and the semi-final against Spain in Vienna. He won his 13th and final cap in October 2008.

Career statistics

Club

International

Honours
1. FC Nürnberg
 DFB-Pokal: 2006–07

Russia
 UEFA European Championship bronze medalist: 2008

References

External links
 
 
 
 Career, statistic, goals 

Living people
1983 births
Sportspeople from Voronezh
Association football midfielders
FC Spartak Moscow players
FC Fakel Voronezh players
1. FC Nürnberg players
Expatriate footballers in Germany
Bundesliga players
2. Bundesliga players
Association football forwards
Karlsruher SC players
Russia under-21 international footballers
Russia international footballers
Russian expatriate footballers
Russian expatriate sportspeople in Germany
Russian footballers
UEFA Euro 2008 players
Russian Premier League players